The 2012–13 South Dakota Coyotes men's basketball team represented the University of South Dakota during the 2012–13 NCAA Division I men's basketball season. The Coyotes, led by 25th year head coach Dave Boots, played their home games at the DakotaDome and were members of The Summit League. They finished the season 10–20, 5–11 in The Summit League play to finish in a tie for seventh place. They lost in the quarterfinals of The Summit League tournament to Western Illinois.

Roster

Schedule

|-
!colspan=9| Regular season

|-
!colspan=9| 2013 The Summit League men's basketball tournament

References

South Dakota Coyotes men's basketball seasons
South Dakota
Coyo
Coyo